The Royal Victorian Order is an order of knighthood awarded by the sovereign of the United Kingdom and several Commonwealth realms. It is granted personally by the monarch and recognises personal service to the monarchy, the Royal Household, royal family members, and the organisation of important royal events. The order was officially created and instituted on 23 April 1896 by letters patent under the Great Seal of the Realm by Queen Victoria. It was instituted with five grades, the two highest of which were Knight Grand Cross (GCVO) and Knight Commander (KCVO), which conferred the status of knighthood on holders (apart from foreigners, who typically received honorary awards not entitling them to the style of a knight). Women were not admitted until George V's successor Edward VIII altered the statutes of the order in 1936.

No limit was placed on the number of appointments which could be made. George V appointed 160 Knights Grand Cross to the order between succeeding to the throne on 6 May 1910 and his death on 20 January 1936 (an average of approximately 6.25 a year).

List of Knights Grand Cross 
Source: list in Galloway, pp. 209–212.

References

Citations

Bibliography 
 P. Duckers (2004), British Orders and Decorations (Princes Risborough: Shire Publications Ltd)
 P. Galloway, D. Stanley, D. Martin (1996), Royal Service, volume 1 (London: Victorian Publishing)
 C. McCreery (2008), On Her Majesty's Service: Royal Honours and Recognition in Canada (Toronto: Dundurn Press)
 W. M. Shaw (1906), The Knights of England, volume i (London: Sherratt and Hughes; OCLC 185192520)

British honours system
Royal Victorian Order
Royal Victorian